Corinna Lawrence (born 25 June 1990) is a British épée fencer. 

Lawrence was the British Olympic Association's 2011 Olympic Athlete of the Year for Fencing. She competed at the 2012 Summer Olympics in the Women's épée, but was defeated in the second round by reigning European champion Simona Gherman.

References

External links

 Profile at the European Fencing Confederation

British female épée fencers
1990 births
Living people
Alumni of King's College London
Olympic fencers of Great Britain
Fencers at the 2012 Summer Olympics
People educated at Plymouth High School for Girls
European Games competitors for Great Britain
Fencers at the 2015 European Games